On Native Soil is a 2006 documentary by Linda Ellman narrated by Kevin Costner and Hilary Swank. The film analyzes the efforts by the families of 9/11 victims to create the 9/11 Commission and what information was revealed by it.

External links 
 The official website to the documentary 
 

2006 films
2006 documentary films
Films scored by Michael Tavera
Documentary films about the September 11 attacks
American documentary films
9/11 Commission
2000s English-language films
2000s American films